The Frost Report is a satirical television show hosted by David Frost. It introduced John Cleese, Ronnie Barker, and Ronnie Corbett to television, and launched the careers of other writers and performers. It premiered on BBC1 on 10 March 1966 and ended on 12 December 1967, with a total of 26 regular episodes over the course of 2 series and 2 specials as well.

Cast and writers

The main cast were Frost, Corbett, Cleese, Barker, Sheila Steafel, and Nicky Henson. Musical interludes were provided by Julie Felix, while Tom Lehrer also performed songs in a few episodes.

Writers and performers on The Frost Report later worked on many other television shows. They included Bill Oddie and Tim Brooke-Taylor (of The Goodies), Barry Cryer, Ronnie Barker, Ronnie Corbett, Dick Vosburgh, Spike Mullins (who would write Corbett's Two Ronnies monologues), Antony Jay (Yes Minister and Yes Prime Minister), and future Python members Graham Chapman, John Cleese, Eric Idle, Terry Jones, and Michael Palin. It was while working on The Frost Report that the future Pythons developed their writing style. The established comedy writer Marty Feldman, as well as the Frank Muir and Denis Norden partnership, were also contributors to the programme.

A special compilation from series 1, titled "Frost over England" (featuring the classic Cleese/Barker/Corbett class sketch, which parodied the British class system) won the Rose d'Or at the 1967 Montreux festival. A special one-off reunion was broadcast on Easter Monday (24 March) 2008. It ran for ninety minutes and was followed by "Frost over England".

Archive status
The entire second series, with the exceptions of "The Frost Report on Women" and the "Frost Over Christmas" special, are missing from the BBC archives and are considered lost. Home recorded audio tapes are known to exist for all of these.

Episodes

Series overview

Series 1 (1966)

Special (1967)

Series 2 (1967)

Christmas special (1967)

Similar shows
David Frost hosted related comedy shows with similar casts. These included Frost on Sunday in 1968 with the two Ronnies, Josephine Tewson, and Sam Costa. The same year, he presented Frost on Saturday. There was a reunion show, The Frost Report is Back, broadcast in 2008.

"Lord Privy Seal"

A sketch in The Frost Report is responsible for the term "Lord Privy Seal" in the British television industry, meaning the practice of matching too literal imagery with every element of the accompanying spoken script. In the sketch, the practice was taken to an extreme by backing a "news report" about the Lord Privy Seal (a senior Cabinet official) with images, in quick succession, of a lord, a privy, and a seal balancing a ball on its nose.

References

External links
 
 Comedy Guide
British Film Institute Screen Online

BBC television sketch shows
Lost BBC episodes
British satirical television series
1966 British television series debuts
1967 British television series endings
1960s British television sketch shows
Black-and-white British television shows
English-language television shows